Mexistenasellus is a genus of isopod crustaceans in the family Stenasellidae.

Species

The genus contains eight species, of which 4 are listed as endangered or vulnerable on the IUCN Red List.

Mexistenasellus atotonoztok Álvarez & Guillén-Servent, 2016
Mexistenasellus coahuila Cole & W. L. Minckley, 1972 – 
Mexistenasellus colei Bowman, 1982
Mexistenasellus floridensis Lewis & Sawicki, 2016
Mexistenasellus magniezi Argano, 1973
Mexistenasellus nulemex Bowman, 1982 – 
Mexistenasellus parzefalli Magniez, 1972 – 
Mexistenasellus wilkensi Magniez, 1972 – 

Mexistenasellus coahuila lives in the United States and Mexico, while Mexistenasellus floridensis  is found in Florida. The other species are endemic to Mexico.

References

Asellota
Freshwater crustaceans of North America
Taxa named by Wendell L. Minckley
Taxonomy articles created by Polbot